Ronald William Gainer (born August 24, 1947) is an American prelate of the Roman Catholic Church. He has been serving as the bishop of the Diocese of Harrisburg in Pennsylvania since 2014. He previously served as bishop of the Diocese of Lexington in Kentucky from 2002 to 2014.

Biography

Early life 
Ronald Gainer was born on August 24, 1947, in Pottsville, Pennsylvania, as an only child to parents of Eastern European descent. He attended St. Charles Borromeo Seminary in Overbrook, Philadelphia, where he obtained a Bachelor of Arts degree in 1969 and a Master of Divinity degree in 1973.

Priesthood 
Gainer was ordained to the priesthood by Bishop Joseph Mark McShea for the Diocese of Allentownon May 19, 1973. After his ordination, Gainer served as pastor of Holy Trinity Parish in Whitehall. He also served as secretary of the diocesan tribunal, secretary for Catholic life and evangelization, and judicial vicar. Gainer then attended the Pontifical Gregorian University in Rome, earning a Licentiate in canon law in 1986. He was raised by the Vatican to the rank of honorary prelate on August 20, 1991.

Bishop of Lexington 
On December 13, 2002, Gainer was appointed the second Bishop of the Diocese of Lexington by Pope John Paul II. He received his episcopal consecration on February 22, 2003, from Archbishop Thomas Kelly, with Bishops Edward Cullen and Joseph Kurtz serving as co-consecrators. In 2004, Gainer urged Catholic politicians who supported abortion rights to refrain from receiving Communion.

Bishop of Harrisburg 
On January 24, 2014, Gainer was appointed the eleventh Bishop of the Diocese of Harrisburg by Pope Francis.  He was installed on March 19, 2014, in the Cathedral of St. Patrick in Harrisburg. ,  Gainer serves as chair of the board for Cross Catholic Outreach, an international charity. Gainer currently serves as the President of the Pennsylvania Catholic Conference, the public affairs policy arm of the ten Catholic (eight Latin Rite and two Byzantine Rite) dioceses in Pennsylvania.

Sports policy 
On July 1, 2014, Gainer introduced a sports policy prohibiting girls at Catholic schools in the diocese from participating in any wrestling, tackle football, or tackle rugby matches, either on all-girl or coed teams. The policy also requires male wrestlers to forfeit any matches against female opponents. However, the policy does not bar tackle football or rugby teams from playing against coed teams. According to Gainer's policy, the ban applies to any sports "...that involve substantial and potentially immodest physical contact".

Sexual abuse crimes 
In 2016, Pennsylvania Attorney General Josh Shapiro launched a grand jury investigation into allegations of sexual abuse and the handling of these allegations by six dioceses, including the Diocese of Harrisburg. According to The Philadelphia Inquirer, in 2017 the Diocese of Harrisburg and the Diocese of Greensburg attempted to shut down the grand jury investigation.

On August 1, 2018, Gainer disclosed the names of 71 past and present clergy affiliated with the Diocese of Harrisburg who were credibly accused of sexually abusing children. The majority of persons on the list were deceased, and some were accused only after their deaths.  Gainer explained the rationale for releasing this information:  "While these men are not a risk to the public, I still felt compelled to release their names in an effort to confirm for those brave survivors... that we have heard their cries and taken them seriously."  Gainer also stated that prior to 2002, some lawsuits had been settled using confidentiality clauses, and he was now releasing all victims from such confidentiality agreements.Immediately following the release of the list, Gainer announced removal of the names of all the bishops of Harrisburg since 1947 from buildings or rooms.  This was in response to their failures to protect children from sexual abuse.

See also

 Catholic Church by country
 Catholic Church hierarchy
 Historical list of the Catholic bishops of the United States
 List of Catholic bishops of the United States
 List of the Catholic dioceses of the United States
 Lists of patriarchs, archbishops, and bishops

References

External links
 Roman Catholic Diocese of Harrisburg Official Site

Episcopal succession

 

1947 births
Living people
21st-century Roman Catholic bishops in the United States
People from Pottsville, Pennsylvania
Pontifical Gregorian University alumni
Roman Catholic bishops of Harrisburg
Roman Catholic bishops of Lexington
St. Charles Borromeo Seminary alumni